The following events occurred during the year 2015 in Ethiopia.

Incumbents
 Prime Minister: Hailemariam Desalegn 
 President: Mulatu Teshome

Events

February
 1 February - Testing of the Addis Ababa Light Rail, the first light railway in Sub-Saharan Africa, begins.

March
 5 March - 2015 African Junior Athletics Championships begin in Addis Ababa.

May
 24 May - Voters go to the polls to vote in the general elections with the ruling party facing no viable opposition.

September
 20 September - First line of the Addis Ababa Light Rail opens.

October
 10 October - The Gilgel Gibe III Dam begins to generate power.

November
 21 November - 2015 CECAFA Cup, hosted in Addis Ababa, begins.

References

 
Ethiopia
2010s in Ethiopia
Ethiopia
Years of the 21st century in Ethiopia